Williamstown High School is a public co-educational secondary school located in the Melbourne suburb of Williamstown. Williamstown high is one of four government schools in the Western Suburbs of Melbourne. It is a multi-campus school with both campuses located within walking distance. The two campuses are known as Bayview street and Pasco street campus. It is known to be one of the first public schools in Melbourne with a history of over 100 years.

Campuses

Bayview Street Campus 
Bayview St is the junior campus which houses students Years 7–9. It caters for approximately 750 students and employs around 75 staff members. The Bayview Street Campus was formerly the Point Gellibrand Girls School.

Sustainability

The School was redeveloped in 2005 to become a model for environmental education. The campus is the first high school in Victoria to receive a 5 Green Star rating by Green Building Council of Australia and has won several awards for its sustainable and clever design. While the schools' design was built with sustainability as its main factor, the curriculum to students is also heavily focused on the environment. The Jawbone marine sanctuary is located behind the school and plays a key role in the Marine education centre located in the school. The marine centre is staffed by a marine biologist and features 9 habitat displays, its role is to promote awareness to the delicate marine ecosystem. Some environmental features of the school include 57 solar panels, rainwater collection system for flushing toilets and irrigation, vegetable gardens, composting facilities, wetland area, built using plantation and recycled materials and a unique design layout for natural cooling/heating without the use of electricity.

Pasco Street Campus 
The Pasco Campus is a historic site that provides education to Year 10 and VCE students. The Campus was built in 1875 and consists of buildings from different decades. The oldest building dates from 1867.

The Campus is split into the following blocks:
S Block (Science Labs)
A Block (Math and media classrooms, Administration office)
L Block (Library, normal classrooms, computer labs, staff offices)
P Block/Portables (Classrooms that range from French, English, History etc.)
Q Block/Quadrangle (technology and normal classrooms, staff offices)

The students at Pasco are given many opportunities for their learning and their future. This includes:
A full range of VCE units and accelerated – university studies
Vocational Education and Training in Schools – (VETiS)
Victorian Certificate of Applied Learning (VCAL) which is a school-based apprenticeship and an alternative pathway to VCE.

Facilities at Pasco include:
Two drama and art performance areas. Soul City and the Centenary Theatre.
Darkroom Photography
Fully equipped and modern science labs
Recording studio and music rooms
Computer labs
Gym and basketball courts
Fully equipped Wood technology room
Year 12 Study centre

Language Choice 
Williamstown High School offers Indonesian and French as LOTE subjects. Students are given the choice when they commence their studies in year 7. In year 9 they are given the opportunity to either drop or continue their LOTE subject. Students can drop out of their LOTE anytime after Year 9 and or can continue their subject through to VCE.

Japanese LOTE was offered to students until 2014. Due to lack of interest, it is no longer offered at WHS.

House system 
The Houses in WHS are:
 Red House (Hobsons)
 Green House (Greenwich)
 Blue House (Gellibrand)
 Gold House (Philip)

Notable alumni
Notable individuals who studied at the school include:
 Bobby Andonov, singer
 Allan Hird, Sr., Australian rules footballer
 Rachel Jarry, basketball player
 Noel Wilby, Chief Commissioner of Victoria Police (1969–1971)
 Callan Ward, Australian rules footballer
 Aretha Brown, Indigenous youth activist
 Morgan Mitchell- runner

Centenary Theatre
In the 2015–16 School Improvement fund (state budget), $10 million was allocated to the school by the Victorian Government. The budget allocated $500,000 for the delivery of the school's Centenary Theatre project. Along with the fund from the (labor) government the school has been raising funds through community donations and fund-raising since 2012. It is estimated the school community to have raised $500,000 since August 2012. In 2013 and 2014 all new year 7 students received a reusable money donation box to collect loose change to help build the theatre. These red and blue boxes resulted in a competition for students with the chance to win a prize for the heaviest box. Building of the theatre commenced in 2015 and the project was completed and opened at the end of May 2017, in time for the yearly school production. The opening was held by Minister Noonan, the local MLA, School Council President Andrew Egan, and Principal Gino Catalano. The event was accompanied by entertainment by school students.  The theatre or 'performing arts centre' seats 300 people, includes a dance studio and art gallery. The theatre is fully equipped with lighting, bathroom and kitchen facilities, full backstage rooms, curtains and more. n

References

External links
Williamstown High School Website
Williamstown High School design planning

Public high schools in Melbourne
Educational institutions established in 1914
1914 establishments in Australia
Williamstown, Victoria
Buildings and structures in the City of Hobsons Bay